Paula Ivonne Flores González Rubio (born 24 January 1994) is a Mexican karateka. She won one of the bronze medals in the women's kumite -55 kg event at the 2019 Pan American Games held in Lima, Peru.

Achievements

References 

Living people
1994 births
Place of birth missing (living people)
Mexican female karateka
Pan American Games medalists in karate
Pan American Games bronze medalists for Mexico
Karateka at the 2019 Pan American Games
Medalists at the 2019 Pan American Games
21st-century Mexican women